This is a list of flags which have been, or are still today, used on the territory of North Macedonia or by ethnic Macedonians.

North Macedonia

Presidential standard

Historical flags

Local flags

Municipal flags 
Note: This list is incomplete.

Former flags of municipalities

Government flags

Universities

Military flags

Political parties flags

Macedonian diaspora flags

1995 Flag Proposals

Other

Organizations flags

Notes

References

External links
North Macedonia at Flags of the World

 
Macedonia
Flags
Flags